LICD may refer to:

 Least I Could Do, a humor webcomic by Ryan Sohmer and Lar deSouza
 LICD, the ICAO code for Lampedusa Airport, Linosa, Italy